Naba Kumar Doley (born 17 July 1971) is a Bharatiya Janata Party politician from Assam. He was elected in Assam Legislative Assembly election in 2011 and 2016 from Dhakuakhana constituency. He became a minister in the Sarbananda Sonowal-led government in 2016. Formerly, he was with Asom Gana Parishad. He is also the president of Assam Football Association.

References 

Living people
Asom Gana Parishad politicians
Bharatiya Janata Party politicians from Assam
Assam MLAs 2011–2016
Assam MLAs 2016–2021
People from Lakhimpur district
State cabinet ministers of Assam
Assam MLAs 2021–2026
1971 births
Indian football executives